Hot Heels is a lost 1928 American silent comedy film directed by William James Craft and starring Glenn Tryon and Patsy Ruth Miller. It was produced and distributed by Universal Pictures.

A trailer for the film survives.

Cast
Glenn Tryon as Glenn Seth Higgins
Patsy Ruth Miller as Patsy Jones
Greta Yoltz as Fannie
James Bradbury, Sr. as Mr. Fitch
Tod Sloan as Himself, A Jockey
Lloyd Whitlock as Manager Carter
Edward Hearn as Gambler
Walter Brennan as Pool Hall Inhabitant (uncredited)

References

External links

1928 films
American silent feature films
Films directed by William James Craft
Lost American films
Universal Pictures films
American black-and-white films
1928 comedy films
Silent American comedy films
1928 lost films
Lost comedy films
1920s American films